Human performance or Human Performance can refer to:

Science 
 Human performance, the subject of study by performance science
 Human performance, an alternative name for human reliability in human factors and ergonomics
 Human performance technology, in process improvement methodologies
 Human performance modeling, a method of quantifying human behavior, cognition, and processes

Media 
 Human Performance, a 2016 album by American band Parquet Courts
 Human Performance (journal), a scientific journal covering industrial and organizational psychology as it relates to job performance

Other uses 
 Human Performance Center, a multi-purpose arena on the campus of the University of New Orleans

See also 
 
 Job performance